The  is a Japanese railway line which connects Terada Station with Tateyama Station, all within Tateyama, Nakaniikawa District Toyama Prefecture. It is owned and run by Toyama Chihō Railway.

History
The first section of what is now this line was opened by Tateyama Light Railway Co. as a 762mm gauge line between Gohyakkoku and Namerikawa (on the Toyama Chiho Railway Main Line) in 1913. The Gohyakkoku – Iwakuraji section opened in 1921.

In 1931 the company merged with the Toyama Electric Railway Co., which opened the Terada – Gohyakkoku section the same year, 1067mm gauge and electrified at 1500 VDC. The Gohyakkoku – Iwakuraji section was converted to 1067mm gauge and electrified in 1936.

In the meantime the Toyama Prefectural Government opened the Iwakuraji – Chigaki section between 1921 and 1923 as 1067mm gauge, electrifying the section at 600 VDC in 1927, and raising the voltage to 1500 VDC in 1937, the year the section to Arimineguchi opened. 

All these lines were merged in 1943 upon the creation of the Toyama Chihō Railway Co., and the line was extended to Tateyama the same year.

CTC signalling was commissioned on the line in 1976.

Station list

References
This article incorporates material from the corresponding article in the Japanese Wikipedia

Rail transport in Toyama Prefecture
Tateyama Kurobe Alpine Route
1067 mm gauge railways in Japan